Blountsville is a town in Blount County, Alabama, United States. As of the 2010 census it had a population of 1,684.

Blount County was created by the Alabama territorial legislature on February 6, 1818, from land ceded to the federal government by the Creek Nation on August 9, 1814. It was named for Gov. Willie G. Blount of Tennessee, who provided assistance to settlers in Alabama during the Creek War of 1813–14. It lies in the northeastern section of the state, generally known as the mineral region.

History
What became Blountsville appears on an 1819 map as the mixed Creek/Cherokee Native American village of "Wassausey" (meaning Bear Meat Cabin, the name of an Indian translator who lived there). The town was established by Caleb Fryley and Johnny Jones in 1816 as Bear Meat Cabin. It became a popular stop for westward-bound settlers who streamed into the area at the end of the Creek War. The post office was opened as Blountsville on October 20, 1825, and incorporated on December 13, 1827. It was the county seat until 1889 when the government was moved to Oneonta.

There were many schools in the town in the early years: The Academy, Blount College and the District Agricultural School, plus the public schools. The Blount County Courthouse and jail was built in 1833 and remained there until it was moved to Oneonta. A major crossroads in early Alabama, Blountsville became a Confederate depot for the cavalry. Confederate forces led by General Nathan Bedford Forrest and Union forces led by General Abel Streight skirmished briefly in the town on May 1, 1863, and Major General Lovell H. Rousseau and his Union cavalry occupied the town in July 1864. Blount College was in the building that was originally the courthouse. It was established in 1890. The beautiful Blountsville United Methodist Church was established in 1818 and is the oldest building in Blountsville and is still in use today. Another old building in Blountsville was once known as the Barclift House.  Built in 1834 as Hendricks Tavern, it is now owned and is being restored by the Ortiz family.

Geography
Blountsville is located in northern Blount County, in the Blountsville Valley at the intersection of County Highway 26 and U.S. Highway 231. Alabama Highway 79 runs through the southern corner of Blountsville, leading northeast to Guntersville and southwest to Birmingham.

Demographics

2020 census

As of the 2020 United States census, there were 1,826 people, 702 households, and 486 families residing in the town.

2010 census
As of the census of 2010, there were 1,684 people, 654 households, and 439 families residing in the town. The racial makeup of the town was 87.3% White, 0.7% Black, 1.0% Native American, 0.4% Asian, 0.9% Pacific Islander, 8.8% from other races, and 1.0% from two or more races. 15.3% of the population were Hispanic or Latino of any race.

There were 654 households, out of which 30.7% had children under the age of 18 living with them, 48.0% were married couples living together, 14.1% had a female householder with no husband present, and 32.9% were non-families. 29.2% of all households were made up of individuals, and 14.9% had someone living alone who was 65 years of age or older. The average household size was 2.57 and the average family size was 3.16.

In the town, the population was spread out, with 25.8% under the age of 18, 9.6% from 18 to 24, 25.4% from 25 to 44, 24.5% from 45 to 64, and 14.7% who were 65 years of age or older. The median age was 37.6 years. For every 100 females, there were 94.5 males. For every 100 females age 18 and over, there were 101.8 males.

The median income for a household in the town was $25,238, and the median income for a family was $41,042. Males had a median income of $23,839 versus $24,940 for females. The per capita income for the town was $15,372. About 13.0% of families and 18.2% of the population were below the poverty line, including 16.0% of those under age 18 and 20.1% of those age 65 or over.

Education
J.B. Pennington High School (PHS) and Blountsville Elementary School (BES), the town's only two schools, are located in the center of Blountsville. They are both in the Blount County School District.

Attractions

The Freeman House, built circa 1825, was damaged by a storm, and the two-story brick dwelling was rebuilt, using the same bricks, into a one story. The porches face the historic Meat Cabin Road, and the other porch faces U.S. Highway 231. The structure has been renovated by the Blountsville Historical Society and now serves as a museum and visitors' center. Several other buildings of the period have been added to the park and are furnished with period furnishings.  The park is open to the public for tours.

The Thomas Nation House, circa 1835, is now a ruin due to a storm that took all but one and one half walls down in 1998 before the house could be stabilized. The ruins can still be seen from U.S. Highway 231.

Blountsville is also home to the Spring Valley Beach Water Park, one of the few water parks in the lower Sand Mountain area. Spring Valley Beach contains one of the largest swimming pools in the South and seven water slides.  It is also home to the 360 Rush water slide, the only one of its kind in the world.

References

Further reading
Davis, Robert S. A Blountsville Picture Book. Blountsville: Blountsville Historical Society, 1999.
"Blountsville, Alabama: a Case Study in the Use of the R. G. Dun & Company Credit Reports, 1847-1880." Alabama Review 56 (2003): 125–35.
Owen, Thomas McAdory. History of Alabama and Dictionary of Alabama Biography. Chicago: S.J. Clarke Publishing Co., 1921.

External links

Official site

Towns in Blount County, Alabama
1818 establishments in Alabama Territory
Populated places established in 1818
Birmingham metropolitan area, Alabama